Xanthochorus is a genus of sea snails, marine gastropod mollusks in the family Muricidae, the murex snails or rock snails.

Species
Species within the genus Xanthochorus include:

 Xanthochorus buxeus (Broderip, 1833)
 Xanthochorus cassidiformis (Blainville, 1832)

References

Ocenebrinae